Gwyn Davies (10 June 1919 – 1 April 1995) was a Welsh cricketer. He was a right-handed batsman and a right-arm medium-pace bowler who played first-class cricket for Glamorgan. He was born in Cathays and died in Stockport.

A regular club cricketer for Cardiff, Davies, like so many others, was unable to compete regularly in first-class cricket only due to the occurrence of the Second World War, but made two appearances for the county between 1947 and 1948, both times against Lancashire.

Between 1948 and 1950 Davies played Minor Counties cricket with the Glamorgan Second XI.

External links 
 Gwyn Davies at Cricket Archive 

1919 births
1995 deaths
Cathays
Cricketers from Cardiff
Glamorgan cricketers
Welsh cricketers